Parasola is a genus of coprinoid mushrooms in the family Psathyrellaceae.  These small frail fungi have translucent caps where the radiating gills look like the spokes of a parasol (except for P. conopilea which was recently added to the genus).  In the past these mushrooms were classified under Coprinus, but unlike that genus there is no veil and the caps do not really turn to ink, but curl up and wither.

Species
This list is incomplete.

 Parasola auricoma (Pat.) Redhead, Vilgalys & Hopple 2001
 Parasola besseyi (A.H. Sm.) Redhead, Vilgalys & Hopple 2001
 Parasola brunneola (McKnight) Redhead, Vilgalys & Hopple 2001
 Parasola conopilea (Fr.) Örstadius & E. Larss. 2008 (or Parasola conopilus)
 Parasola galericuliformis (Losa ex Watling) Redhead, Vilgalys & Hopple 2001
 Parasola hemerobia (Fr.) Redhead, Vilgalys & Hopple 2001
 Parasola hercules (Uljé & Bas) Redhead, Vilgalys & Hopple 2001
 Parasola kuehneri (Uljé & Bas) Redhead, Vilgalys & Hopple 2001
 Parasola lactea (A.H. Sm.) Redhead, Vilgalys & Hopple 2001
 Parasola leiocephala (P.D. Orton) Redhead, Vilgalys & Hopple (2001)
 Parasola lilatincta (Bender & Uljé) Redhead, Vilgalys & Hopple 2001
 Parasola megasperma (P.D. Orton) Redhead, Vilgalys & Hopple 2001
 Parasola mirabilis (Mont.) Redhead, Vilgalys & Hopple 2001
 Parasola misera (P. Karst.) Redhead, Vilgalys & Hopple 2001
 Parasola nudiceps (P.D. Orton) Redhead, Vilgalys & Hopple 2001
 Parasola pachytera (Berk. & Broome) Redhead, Vilgalys & Hopple 2001
 Parasola plicatilis (Curtis) Redhead, Vilgalys & Hopple 2001
 Parasola schroeteri (P. Karst.) Redhead, Vilgalys & Hopple 2001
 Parasola setulosa (Berk. & Broome) Redhead, Vilgalys & Hopple 2001
 Parasola subprona (Cleland) J.A. Simpson & Grgur. 2001
 Parasola virgulacolens (Cleland) J.A. Simpson & Grgur. 2001

References 

Psathyrellaceae
Agaricales genera